Typhoon Kalmaegi, known in the Philippines as Typhoon Luis, was the 22nd depression and the 15th named storm of the 2014 typhoon season. Kalmaegi was the first storm to make landfall over the Philippines since Typhoon Rammasun, two months prior. The storm caused flooding in Southeast Asia during mid-September.

Meteorological history 

On September 10, a tropical disturbance formed northeast of Palau with a possibility of becoming a tropical cyclone in the next few days. Later the same day, the JTWC had reported that it had intensified into a tropical depression, giving it the designation "15W". Early on September 12, the JMA started to track 15W as a tropical depression. In the same time, PAGASA had issued their first advisories on the storm, naming it as Tropical Depression Luis. As Luis entered a more conducive environment, it steadily intensified into a tropical storm and was named Kalmaegi by the JMA later that day and the JTWC followed suit on the same day. The storm entered an area of warm waters as the JMA upgraded it to a typhoon, while JTWC upgraded it to a category 1 typhoon late on September 13. Kalmaegi made landfall over Cagayan early the next day, as it start to interact with land and weakened to a tropical storm. On September 15, Kalmaegi entered the South China Sea and intensified again. The typhoon reached its peak strength while making its second landfall over Hainan Island. Kalmaegi rapidly weakened to a large tropical storm as it continued to move in a westward direction. Both agencies classified Kalmaegi as a tropical depression. Later that day, both agencies announced that Kalmaegi had dissipated.

Preparations and impact

Philippines 

Known in the Philippines as Luis, PAGASA had issued some first Signal Warnings over Region II on September 13. PAGASA had also warned residents in regions of Luzon about landslides, thunderstorms and flash floods from the effects of Luis. Several rubber boats and medical aid supplies were prepared.

As the storm was exiting the country, PAGASA reported that the province of Pangasinan was under the "state of calamity" due to flash floods, especially towns in Calasiao, Santa Barbara and even as far as Urdaneta. Meanwhile, the NDRRMC said that landslides had occurred in Cagayan Valley as of September 17. It was also reported that at least 200 houses had been destroyed while 600 were damaged.

As for impacts in the Philippines, a total of 12 people were killed by the storm with eight of them drowning as the boat they were on sank due to rogue waves caused by the storm. According to the NDRRMC, damages amounted to ₱1.2 billion (US$27.3 million).

Highest Public Storm Warning Signal

China 
On September 15, the government weather bureau reported that the storm was headed toward southern China at about 19 mph. In Haikou, the capital of Hainan Province, schools were ordered to close on September 16 and 17. Later that day, the storm hit Hong Kong, disrupting flights and forcing the stock market to close, as well as causing 29 injuries. The stock market reopened Tuesday morning. The storm hit Hainan on September 16, where more than 90,000 people were evacuated from its east coast prior to the storm's impact. Kalmaegi killed a total of 11 people and caused about CN¥17.74 billion (US$2.89 billion).

Vietnam 
The typhoon was also felt in Vietnam, with strong gusty winds and flash floods reported. As of September 18, it was reported that the death toll had risen to 9 and 10 were injured. Damages has also been topped to VND20 billion (US$944,000). Another 2 were reported killed on the same day. On September 19, it was reported that 15 were injured. So far, a total of 13 people were reported killed by the storm.

India 
After the dissipation of Kalmaegi, its remnants continued to move towards Eastern India on September 19. With this, it caused flash floods and landslides over the area until it dissipated on September 23. On September 22, it was reported that a total of 12 people had been killed in Meghalaya in the past 72 hours. Several bridges were also reported destroyed.

See also 

Typhoon Ketsana
Typhoon Nesat (2011)
Typhoon Kai-tak (2012)
Tropical Storm Jebi (2013)
Typhoon Rammasun
Typhoon Mangkhut (2018)

References

External links 

Animation sequence from the Hong Kong Observatory

2014 Pacific typhoon season
2014 disasters in the Philippines
Typhoons in the Philippines
Typhoons in China
Typhoons
Kalmaegi